Bill Sharkey's Last Game is a 1909 American silent Western film directed by D. W. Griffith and starring Harry Carey in his debut film.

Cast
 Harry Carey

See also
 List of American films of 1909
 Harry Carey filmography
 D. W. Griffith filmography
 1909 in film

External links
 

1909 films
1909 Western (genre) films
1909 short films
American silent short films
American black-and-white films
Films directed by D. W. Griffith
Silent American Western (genre) films
1900s English-language films
1900s American films